Morton Grove School District 70 is a school district headquartered in Morton Grove, Illinois. It operates Park View School and serves grades PK-8.

History 
Park View, School District 70, is a K-8 one building school district located in Morton Grove, IL, just 15 miles north of Chicago. Established in 1897 with only 148 students, it currently services over 900 students with continued growth projected for the next few years. The population of the students is diverse, and the school has excelled in accommodating each student with a phenomenal staff and special programs for the gifted and talented, the arts, physical education, ESL, as well as special education.

References

External links
 

School districts in Cook County, Illinois